

Introduction 
Oaxaca en la historia y en el mito (English: Oaxaca in history and myth) is a mural created by Arturo García Bustos (1926-2017). García Bustos was "an artist dedicated to the humanistic struggles and liberal ideals that he expressed profoundly in his art." He painted the mural between May 1978 and November,1980 in the Palacio de Gobierno in Oaxaca. Today the location is officially known as the Museo del Palacio Universum, but it is commonly referred to as the Palacio de Gobierno. It is located in Oaxaca de Juárez, México, known in English as Oaxaca City.

A pamphlet distributed to attendees at the inauguration described the mural as a "mapamundi oaxaqueño" or a Oaxacan worldmap. The mural is a visual history of Oaxaca from prehistoric times to modern times. The images selected and not selected in a visual history are key to the final message. Bustos focused on images of the liberal traditions and reform in his interpretation of the history of Oaxaca, largely leaving out those who opposed liberal ideas and also played important roles in Oaxacan and Mexican history.  This article cites academic research and government publications, with the later being prone to perpetuating what has been called  "mithified" history.

In the artist's words:

“Cuando pinté la escalera monumental del Palacio de Gobierno de Oaxaca sentí que lo que había que revelar era la historia que contenían esos corredores por los que habían transitado muchos de los creadores de nuestra historia patria.“

In translation:

“When I painted the monumental staircase of the Government Palace of Oaxaca, I felt that what had to be revealed was the history that those corridors contained through which many of the creators of our national history had passed."

Many of the individuals portrayed on the mural did not literally climb the steps and pass through the corridors where the mural now depicts their history, as the artist suggests, but they did shape the history of Oaxaca and even Mexico.artistic

The artist also explains:

“Somos un pueblo con una historia antigua que ha demostrado su genio labrando piedras para edificar ciudades que quisieron alcanzar las estrellas, espacios reales en armonía con los paisajes, el cosmos y el hombre”.

Or in English. “We are a people with an ancient history that has demonstrated its genius by carving stones to build cities that wanted to reach the stars, real spaces in harmony with the landscapes, the cosmos and man”

A glossy government-sponsored book about the history of Oaxaca published in 2019, includes this summary about the mural:

"Si para un visitante es interesante apreciar estos murales, para un oaxaqueño debe ser obligatorio conocer cada una de sus imágenes y sentirse orgulloso de esta tierra mexicana."

Or in English. "If it is interesting for a visitor to appreciate these murals, for an Oaxacan it must be mandatory to know each of their images and feel proud of this Mexican land."

The distinguished historian, Francie Chassen-López wrote in 1989, "la historia de Oaxaca es muy poco conocida (the history of Oaxaca is very little known). Understanding what Arturo García Bustos tells us about the history of this region in Oaxaca en la historia y en el mito is a good place to start, to understand some, but not all, aspects of the history of Oaxaca.

Opposition to Arturo García Bustos painting the mural 
The contract to paint the mural was granted by the governor Eliseo Jiménez Ruiz without competition. On May 27, 1978, The Oaxacan artist Rufino Tamayo published a letter to the editor stating that the artistic experience of García Bustos, knowing better for his engravings, "nada tiene que ver con la pintura y mucho menos con la pintura mural."

Or in English, his engravings have nothing to do with painting, much less with mural painting."

On June 3, 1978, 18 Oaxacans, from different professional and artistic domains wrote a letter to the editor supporting Garcia Bustos.

The roots of Mexican Muralism 

A discussion of modern Mexican muralism begins with José Vasconcelos Calderón (1882–1959). He is one of the many readily identifiable history makers portrayed on the mural. Vasconcelos was a colorful and influential leader from Oaxaca. After the Mexican Revolution ended in 1921, as the Secretary of Education, he obtained a large budget and generated projects to foster nationalism. His Secretariat of Education sponsored large patriotic murals in public spaces.

Arturo García Bustos, as a child, living in El Centro of Mexico City, observed these patriotic murals being painted. Later he studied mural painting from the original muralists such as Diego Rivera who were being funded as part of this nationalist art and Frida Kahlo (with Los Fridos). He collaborated with Kahlo on murals on a daily basis in the mid-1940s. The mural Oaxaca en la historia y el mito springs from the roots of muralism and nationalism that José Vasconcelos planted some 50 years before García Bustos painted this mural.

Vasconcelos, a man with deep connections to the past, lived in Coyoacán, a colonial neighbourhood of Mexico City in the home that Hernán Cortés is said to have built for his interpteter-mistress Marina, sometimes referred to as, La Malinche, 500 years ago. García Bustos, always the champion of Mexican history and antiquity, purchased the home in the early 1960s and lived there for half a century, painting with his wife, the artist, Rina Lazo.

General Description 

The artist used the elaborate, time-consuming encaustic technique, using heated wax. The mural tells the stories of Huaxyacac-Antequera-Oaxaca-Oaxaca de Juárez (0axaca City) in three horizontal layers.

It is said that the bottom layer of each panel pictures everyday life. The middle layer illustrates forces and events shaping the history of Oaxaca. The third, or top layer of the mural, represents the ideals and leaders of Oaxaca through the three eras portrayed. The artist divided the history of the area now known as Oaxaca into three panels, representing different timeframes, in chronological order; Prehispanic, sometimes called the pre-Columbian era, of some 10,000 or maybe 20,000 years ago to 1521, the second era is colonial times (1521 to 1821) and the third panel represents the Mexican War of Independence , the Reform War, the Second French Intervention and The Mexican Revolution (1810 to 1921 and beyond).

Prehispanic Panel 

The Prehispanic panel celebrates the lives, values and achievements of indigenous people before the arrival of the Spaniards. This is a common subject of Mexican Muralism. The panel highlights mountains and José, two types of prehispanic structures are depicted, several domestic and artistic skills, the development of agriculture is examined. As well the panel reveals how codices are made and used as well as García Bustos demonstrates a gold disc being prepared and we see tribute being collected.

Mountains and Lightning 

The top left corner of the prehispanic panel depicts a mountain and the other two panels of the mural also contain mountains, a reminder that 90% of the State of Oaxaca is mountainous. This terrain has strongly impacted the history and myths of Oaxaca as reflected in several elements of the prehispanic panel. The isolation created by the mountains, called Sierra Madre de Oaxaca and the Sierra Norte de Oaxaca have helped to generate and sustain 16 formally registered indigenous peoples of Oaxaca. An immense map in the National Museum of Antropología in Mexico City, (see below) captures the predominance of mountains surrounding in the state of Oaxaca. The prehispanic city state called . Monte Albán, appears in green in the map below. Some 20 other prehispanic settlements also appear on the map. An immense lake, supposedly in the Oaxaca Valley would have been a source of food.

The top left corner of the panel also depicts Lightning bolts emanating from the sky. This gives us a hint of the power that Zapotecs and Mixtecs saw in lightning and the sky as the source of life. And García Bustos also depicts Lightning bolts sending energy to the maize (corn) in the milpa.

Prehispanic Structures 
There are two main prehispanic structures in the panel. A palace in the top left of the panel, introduced above, and a thatched open air gathering place in the middle of the panel, pictured below. The thatched or palapa roof building is what has been used throughout the history of Oaxaca and is still occasionally used today. Note the red pods against the thatch. They are produced by guaje trees and contain edible seeds that some Oaxacans consider to be a delicacy. And the name Oaxaca is derived from the word guaje.

The palace-building evokes the design of the Palace of Mitla. Mitla was inhabited by Zapotec and Mixtec people when the Spaniards arrived in the State of Oaxaca in 1521. It was known as Mitclán and as the entry to the underworld and the Mixtecs and Zapotecs buried their dead here.

Comparing the two images above, the palace as painted by García Bustos strongly resembles the palace at Mitla,. However, floating in the sky in the mural, it also evokes the feeling of Monte Albán which is located 400 meters above the valley floor where Oaxaca City sits. Monte Albán was not inhabited when the Spaniards conquered what is now the state of Oaxaca. Monte Albán was built over centuries by first leveling a mountain. In approximately 600 BC, Zapotecs from surrounding towns like San José de Mogote, gathered and created the first stage of their new city state. 900 years later it had some 40,000 inhabitants and enjoyed commerce with Tenochitlan and the Mayan world. Monte Albán was an advanced community with a calendar, similar to the Aztec calendar, written language, and among other features, a building dedicated to observing the heavens.

Domestic and Artistic Skills 

The figure above portrays five domestic and artistic skills from the Oaxaca area and other elements of prehispanic life. Starting with the background image in the top left corner, a woman prepares food with a metate which is used to grind grain and seeds. Metates were first used in México some 5,000 years ago. In the second image in the background, we see an adult tending a child. Children in Mesoamérica faced many challenges. In front of the adult and child a woman sits in her bright gown. To their left, two women appear to be weaving. Below the guaje pods, described above, and to the right are wild turkeys or guajolotes as they are known in México. The gray animals blending into their surroundings and to the left of the turkeys are Mexican hairless dogs known as Xoloitzcuintle, or Xolos. They served as pets, spiritual icons and food in prehispanic times. The two women in front of the dog are shaping pottery. One man in front appears to be carving a mask.

Placing all of these crafts surrounding one house makes it look as if people lived in self-sufficient units, making their own pottery, textiles and more. Archeological records from prehispanic times indicate that Oaxacan handicrafts have been normally made in highly specialized, specific communities. So each of the handicrafts pictured here would have been made in a distinct village, in prehispanic times as is often the case today.

Agriculture 
The artist illustrates the birth of agriculture in Mesoamerica with four images. Thus, illustrating some of the earliest instances of agriculture in the World, some 10,000 years ago. The wild grass-like image pictured below represents teosintle. This is the grandfather of maize, often called corn. As one can gather from the example of teosintle below, it was small with a few minuscule, hard grains and creating soft, sweet corn, in large cobs, from the original wild grass was a major exercise of observation and patience.

Some of the earliest evidence of the domestication of teosinte and other plants has been discovered in caves in the state of Oaxaca.

The image below illustrates a family cultivating the soil, one of the first steps in organizing agriculture. Farming is a group effort and required the move from a hunter-gatherer phase and into small farming communities such as  San José Mogote which is located in the Oaxaca area,

The digging stick being used to cultivate the soil is a uictli in Náhuatl. After the Conquest, with the Spanish language dominating, it was called a coa.

The next image illustrates a man and a woman working the ground with a uictli. The man and woman are working in a milpa.

The woman's skirt appears to be woven, a step up from the loosely draped garment of the previous figure. Perhaps it was woven at Monte Alban more than 2,000 years ago.  In addition to the corn growing behind them, there is squash growing at their feet, as seen in the image below, an element of the three sisters method of cultivation.

The man has a gourd around his waist. Gourds were used as a container for seeds 8,000 years ago, or longer.

Codices 
García Bustos incorporates accurate depictions of prehispanic codices in his mural, using them to depict mythology and history. The Mixtec codices are rich sources of information and they have been examined in many books and articles. High definition versions of the codices can be studied online.

Mixtec codices 
The existing Mixtec prehispanic codices, either six or eight in number, and their Mayan counterparts are the only historical and genealogical documents that survived the Spanish conquest. Other codices created after the conquest were made with Spanish influence as was the case with the so-called Aztec codices. Codices helped hereditary rulers establish their right to govern from one generation to another. The codices also demonstrated that the gods played a role in the birth of rulers, thereby establishing their connection to the gods and the divine right to rule.

García Bustos, true to his pursuit of realism in his creations, used several images from the Mixtec codices. The stories portrayed in the codices are largely mythical. Myths, although they are not literal truths, reflect the way that people think and in Mesoamérica are important in many ways including art, architecture, poetry, and religion.

The image below, from the mural, is an example of García Bustos placing content from a codex in his mural. This image is almost an exact reproduction of a panel from page 13 of the Vienna Codex. An article by Jansen and Pérez Jiménez interprets this image as one of several related to the foundation and ritual carried out in the east palace of heaven.

At the bottom left of the figure above there is a capital letter A, joined with a stylized circle around the middle. Normally this A-O symbol is attached to one of four symbols, thus forming a year sign used in the 52 year-cycle Mixtec calendar. Since this symbol does not include one of the four additional symbols, the explanation from a reputable research site is that the capital letter A symbol with an O in the middle is a symbol for the beginning of time. Similar images with large "As" appear on the three panels of the mural.

Painting a Codex 
Below, a Mixtec artist is painting a codex. The folded pages are strips of tanned deer hide covered with a white gesso. The colors used were gold ochre, burned sienna, carmine red, turquoise blue, olive green, grey and black. But García Bustos chose to use other colors and less crimson than the original codices, more inline with the overall colors of the mural.

Mixtec Tree of Life 
The image below reflects elements of the Yuta Tnoho Tree Glyph; found on page 37 of the Yuta Tnoho Codex. The crossed limbs of a pochote tree, a newborn child, the whirlwinds representing Quetzalcoatl (the source of rain and life) are all elements of this mixteca Tree of Life. Humankind, in this creation myth is said to have developed from a tree. The male and female branches of the tree are crossed in order to produce human life.

The two main figures above, one male, one female have inspired different interpretations. Some see in the two figures the story of a town being formed by an indigenous couple. Other see a wedding. There seem to be no notes from the artist to settle the debate. The clues to the identities of the people represented lie in the glyphs below their figures, indicating their dates of birth, which are also used as their names. The male figure on the left, identified by a bare chest, with an alligator icon below him and four dots, is Lord Four Alligators. The woman on the right, identified by her long hair, with the skull and one dot is Lady One Death. The newborn baby, born from the tree, is a key element for the Mixtec rulers because the child establishes the ruling line on the Mixtecs of Apoala. They extended their domain and power through marriages among leading families.

Dates and Names on codices 
The Mixtec calendar is similar to the Aztec calendar. In the Mixtec culture, names were taken from birthdates on the ritual calendar.  We observed above that the name of Lady One Death is indicated on the mural by a skull for death and one dote for the year one. There are 20 glyphs, mostly selected from nature, like the skull, for days on codices, and used throughout Mesoamérica. And there are 13 periods of 20 days.  This makes for a ritual year of 260 days. There was also a calendar of 365 days and a cycle of 52 years.

Codex Names 
The Vienna Codex mentioned above is also known as Codex Vindobonensis (Mexicanus 1) and of late also known as Codex Yuta Tnoho, named after its area of origin, not after Vienna where it ended up in Europe. Currently the area of Yuta Tnoho is called Santiago Apoala and it is located in the state of Oaxaca. In Mixtec mythology Yuta Tnoho is the birthplace of the Mixtec people. The birth of the Mixtec people is captured in the original codex by a Yuta Tnoho Tree of life. The tree of life is a key element in many of the world's mythologies and the artist has made it the largest image of the prehispanic panel. Although García Bustos has not duplicated the original codex as he has in other instances.

Mixtec Tree of Life 
Codices helped hereditary rulers establish their right to govern from one generation to another. The codices also demonstrated that the gods played a role in the birth of rulers, thereby establishing their connection to the gods. And the stories depicted of subsequent generations of family members illustrated their divine right to rule.

Using a Codex 
Many admire the Mixtec codices as works of art. García Bustos also shows us how they were used. In the image below, a leader is pointing out the meaning of three scenes from a Codex. Viewing the three images being pointed to from bottom to top, the first image is inspired by the Yuta Tnoho Codex as are the second, discussed earlier as well as the top image of corn. 

John Pohl, an American academic, speculates that codices were portable scripts, or storyboards, for celebrating historical events. The codices could be displayed " while a poet recited the text to musical accompaniment, and actors in costume performed parts of the saga.

Arturo García Bustos as a pre-hispanic character 
The image of Arturo García Bustos below bears a striking resemblance to the pre-Hispanic character that we observed above in the scene interpreting a codex. This is one of several examples of how Arturo García Bustos added a personal touch mixed with a hint of irony to the mural he named Oaxaca en la historia y en el mito located in the Palacio de Gobierno of Oaxaca de Juárez.

Gold 
The image of an artisan working with gold strongly resembles a gold disc that archeologists discovered in Tomb 3 at Zaachila in the state of Oaxaca. This exemplifies the realism that characterizes García Bustos' art. The Aztecs demanded gold as tribute  after they conquered what is now Oaxaca. Similar gold disks are depicted in the Mendoza Codex, indicating gold as tribute to the victors after a military victory.

The gold rush to Oaxaca started after Montezuma told the Spanish conquistador Hernán Cortés that he obtained his gold from Oaxaca. Cortés wasted no time in sending troops to conquer Huaxyacac as the Aztecs, or more correctly the Mexicas, called the area of present-day Oaxaca. Cortez, also known as the Marquessate of the Valley of Oaxaca claimed large tracts of land around Oaxaca for himself and his ancestors. The presence of gold in the mural also highlights the motherload of gold objects discovered in 1932 in Tomb 7 at the Zapotec-Mixtec site, called Monte Albán by the Spanish.

Tribute 
In the image below, young conquered people are paying tribute. A close observation of the bowl reveals gemstones, perhaps jade. This type of clothing was thought to grant the virtues of the animal from which the clothing was derived. Some warriors worn jaguar costumes but they were not from real jaguars. The girdle around the collector of tribute collector resembles part of the gear of a player in the Mesoamerican ball game, that was played throughout Mesoamerica and in Oaxaca from ancient times, sometimes called ulama and pelota.

Fearful young women 
The Aztecs or more properly the Mexicas conquerors of Oaxaca n the 1480s about 40 years before the Spanish conquest. They exacted tribute and sacrificed enemy soldiers. The victorious Mexicas demanded gold as we saw in the early discussion of gold. Slaves were also taken in war. Some were sacrificed and that might account for the look of fear in the eyes of the young women in the image below. Although one resource suggests the young women are participating in an unspecified religious ceremony. All three panels include a character in the bottom right corner that generate questions in the mind of the viewer.

Colonial Panel 

The colonial panel covers 300 years, starting with the arrival of Spanish soldiers or Conquistadors, in November,1531 in what was then called Huaxyacac, some three months after the fall of Tenochitlan. The panel highlights the Conquest, Princess Donají, construction, mistreatment of indigenous people, Sor Juana de la Cruz, Miguel Cabrera, Manuel Fernández Fiallo, cochineal, church music and organs, craftsmen and Spanish colonizers.

The Conquest in Oaxaca (Huaxyacac) 

In the image above, the Spanish leader stands below a gallows type structure, possibly used for public hangings. The Spanish invaders have swords and long poles. An indigenous person is held in the stock while the Spaniard appears to be poking him.

The indigenous people, dressed in white, have only poles. Their white costumes reflect the restrictions that the Spanish rulers placed on clothing.

These figures represent the initial conflict of the Spaniards with the indigenous peoples of Oaxaca: Amuzgos, Mixtecs, Nahuas, Triquis, Zapotecos and more. In November 1521, just three months after conquering Tenochtitlán, (Mexico City), Hernán Cortés sent Francisco de Orozco and 400 Aztec warriors to take Huaxyacac as it was known then and Oaxaca, as it is called today. They travelled over 400 kilometers from Tenochtitlán (Mexico City). Hernan Cortés never visited the area, although he was granted 23,000 vassals and properties of more than 11,500 km2. Spanish administrators and settlers took the land from established people and also demanded tribute. Cortés also claimed the land where Oaxaca stands today but the residents objected and in the end the King of Spain agreed with them.

A tightly packed group of people, such as García Bustos depicts is a common feature of Mexican muralists, like Diego Rivera. This reflects the Marxist view of history, that events are shaped by a struggle between a large group of the under-privileged class, against a small group of the privileged class that is holding power. The Spanish established the community called Antequera in 1529. After the War of Independence (1810–21) it was named Oaxaca.

Donají 
The legend of Donají is a tragic love story, combined with patriotism. The image above shows the floating head of Donají. She was a Zapotec princess but fell in love with Nucano, a Mixtec prince. The Zapotec and the Mixtecs were often at war. Donají committed a treasonous act that led to a Zapotec military victory over the Mixtecs. As a result, the Mixtecs murdered her and threw her body into the Atoyac river where her head was found by a shepherd boy, years later, in perfect condition, according to the legend.

Donají head is also used as a logo for the city of Oaxaca and the legend of Donají has had top billing in the annual Oaxacan dance festival called the Guelaguetza.

Construction 
Workmen of various skin colors are pictured below constructing huge buildings in Oaxaca.

During the colonial period, laborers like those you see above built over two dozen colonial churches and convents in el centro of Antequera.

An order of 1535 mandated, “the indigenous of the city of Antequera and towns of the bishopric of Oaxaca, will help to build the churches” so labor was free. It took 26 years to construct the stonework of the Cathedral of Oaxaca, starting in 1535. And structures had to be rebuilt after earthquakes. It was finally consecrated  on 12 July 1733.

Studies of the churches of the State of Oaxaca include the santos in the 16th-century Dominican churches of Oaxaca, Mexico.

Mistreatment of Indigenous People in Antequera 

In the image on the top left corner of the colonial panel we saw indications of the mistreatment of indigenous people and potential for more mistreatment. The image above shows an indigenous person being beaten, while a Spaniard on horseback watches. Stories abound of the cruelty of the Spanish colonizers to the original inhabitants of Antequera. The most egregious case starts with the first governor of Antequera, in 1529 with Juan Peláez de Barrio. In a year and a half in office he set a standard for corruption and immorality that would be hard to duplicate, even in a lifetime. He specialized in throwing natives to the dogs. He had a penchant for acquiring slaves, branding them on the face and selling them. By one estimate he branded 600 indigenous slaves.

Sor Juana Inés de la Cruz and Miguel Cabrera 

The image of Sor Juana Inés de la Cruz (1648–1695) and Miguel Mateo Maldonado Cabrera (1695–1768) fills the center of the colonial panel. Note that Sor Juana died in 1695, the same year that Miguel Cabrera was born. Cabrera nevertheless painted a renowned portrait of Sor Juana. And if you look closely, you'll see that García Bustos imagined that he was able to do it with some help.

Both were famous in the colony of Nueva España and Spain. Miguel Cabrera was born in the state of Oaxaca and became famous for his rendering of Sor Juana, the Virgin of Guadalupe, pictured below and many other Baroque pieces.

Sor Juana wrote a play that was performed in Antequera (Oaxaca) on November 25, 1691, the feast of Santa Catarina, in the cathedral. The play is called a villancico (sometimes called a Christmas Carol), but it is unlike any modern Christmas Carol. It delves into such areas as beauty, wisdom and love. It celebrates Christianity and feminine wisdom and includes Greek and Roman references as well as references to Cleopatra. The play, not necessarily the life of Saint Catherine, has many parallels with the life of Sor Juana. Saint Catherine is portrayed as precocious; and is devoted to God. She passes the challenge of wise men, as Sor Juana did in the vice regal court. St Catherine is considered the patron saint of academics so we can see why Sor Juana's, an intellectual, was drawn to her story. We can also see why Sor Juana, with her diverse knowledge and skills is appreciated by many Mexicans and is honored on currency and in other ways.

Once again, we see Arturo García Bustos' realistic approach to painting. This time in the sense that he chose to paint an image of Sor Juana that is almost a carbon copy of the original portrait by Cabrera.

If you are wondering why the artist included an angel an explanation is that Sor Juana died the same year that Miguel Cabrera was born.  Without an angel, how would Cabrera know what Sor Juana looked like?

Antequera in the Baroque Period 
The formative period in Mexican and Oaxacan history was the Era of the Baroque from 1600 to 1750. Philanthropy, cochineal, Church organs, music, Catholicism and imposing architecture were some of the outstanding elements of the Baroque Era in Oaxaca and they are represented in the mural.

Manuel Fernández Fiallo, Philanthropy and Cochineal 

In the top right corner of the image above, Manuel Fernández Fiallo de Boralla (1631-1708) is portrayed wearing clothes evoking the color of nopal leaves that we see in the middle of the image. García Bustos depicts the religious Fiallo drafting a church-like structure. Don Fiallo was a main benefactor for the construction of the following Oaxacan churches San Agustín, La Merced, San Francisco and Santa María del Marquesado. A small brown dog, an Xoxo or Xoloitzcuintle, near the left elbow of Don Fiallo evokes symbolism of the Dominican order, the first to send friars to Oaxaca.

In the middle of the image, a peasant woman with a container on her back, is picking insects from nopal cactus to be used in producing bright red cochineal dye. As well, at the bottom of the image, a young woman holds cloth that has been colored by dye made from Cochineal.

This red dye made some Oaxacans rich, including the philanthropist, Manuel Fernández Fiallo. The last testament of Manuel Fernández Fiallo lists 20 churches, convents, schools and orphanages as well as individuals such as his enslaved servant whom he freed and granted money.

Baroque organs 
The green object behind Manuel Fernández Fiallo is a baroque organ. It is one of hundreds that were installed in the religious buildings of Antequera. Today many are being restored and played.

Music 
Music was used by religious orders to convert indigenous people to Christianity. We see a friar, possibly the famous Baroque composer, Manuel de Sumaya, leading a choir. Between 1745 and 1755, Manuel de Sumaya (1680-1755) wrote and conducted music in the Cathedral of Oaxaca, formally known as The Cathedral of Our Lady of the Assumption. Juan Matías (ca.1618–ca.1667)  was a Zapotec Musician who became maestro de capilla of the Oaxaca cathedral in 1655. He was the only indigenous musician to attain this post during colonial rule. These two musicians and others made Oaxaca one of the most notable musical centers in New Spain and the tradition continues today.  The state of Oaxaca has one of many Mexican regional styles of music.

Friar, Catholicism and imposing architecture 
At the bottom right of the panel, a compassionate looking preacher obscures a Dominican coat of arm. In a typical Dominican black robe, this friar holds a cross in one hand and what appears as a piece of wood in another.

When Hernán Cortés made his first landing in what is now Mexico, at San Juan de Ulúa on Maundy Thursday, April 21, 1519, it is said that he immediately ordered the erection of a cross. Thus, Mexico's long process of religious acculturation had begun eventually under the leadership of the Catholic Church in Mexico. And this was also the beginning of the Spanish conquest of the Aztec Empire.

Today Oaxaca has a dozen open Catholic churches and a few that are closed for repairs. And imposing former convents, called ex-convents, are spread throughout the city have served as various public and private buildings including hospitals, jails, museums, hotels and schools.

Craftsmen 
Craftsmen in the colonial era are pictured forging metal. They are in front of remnants of the creations of prehispanic craftsmen. A round column evokes stone-work from the prehispanic period that exist to this day at Mitla, (pictured below). These hieroglyphs referred to as Zapotec script reflect the writing on tablets on display at Monte Albán today, (also pictured below). This is one of the earliest Mesoamerican writing systems. The tablets were created some 2,000 years ago. Columns were built at Mitla some 1,000 years ago.

Spanish Colonizers 
Five characters on the left side of the panel contrast in dress to the people at the top of the page, illustrating the change in the composition of the population of Antequera during the colonial period. Observing clothes and skin color, three wearing bright clothes are Criollo people. Of the two darker-skinned women, the one wearing the black dress could be mestizo and the one carrying the lamp could be indigenous. including the one holding the lamp appear to be Mestizo. We see in these images the influence of the Mexican melting pot, where unlike other western hemisphere colonization efforts, the cultures were blended in Antequera and later Oaxaca.

A Familiar Live Model 
The woman above in the dark dress resembles the woman below, Rina Lazo, the wife of the artist.

A Surprise Visitor 
We have seen evidence of the playfulness of Arturo García Bustos in his portrayal of himself as a pre-Hispanic character, in the image of an angel helping Miguel Carrera paint the famous portrait of Sor Juana. Further evidence of García Bustos' sense of humor is seen in the image below. The story is that tricks were played on the artist as he went about his monumental project. The culprit was thought to be a ghost. The image below depicts the culprit, located between the nopal leaves and the spilled basket.

Independence, Reform, Revolution Panel 

The major topics of the middle panel are the War of Independence (1810–21), the Reform movement often led by Benito Juárez (1854-1876) and the Mexican Revolution (1910-1921).

Five Civil Wars 
In a period of 119 years (1810 to 1921) five civil wars involved the people of Oaxaca. These civil wars are the War of Independence (1810–21), War of Reform (1857-60), the Second French Invasion (1861–67), the Mexican Revolution, (1910–21) and to a minor extent, the Cristero War (1926–29). The image below combines elements from various Mexican wars.

A Collage of War 
Clearly, the bottom half of the image above refers to the War of Independence. In the center of the image, fire engulfs men on horseback. Horseback suggests a later confrontation like the French Invasion or the Mexican Revolution. In front of the flames, a horseman wears a large hat. Such a sombrero was worn by Maximilian during the Second French Intervention and by the leaders of the Mexican Revolution such as Poncho Villa.  The image of the  Virgin of Guadalupe dominates as we will see below.

The top images reflect exploited campesinos working in the production of sugar. The Mexican Revolution started on the 100th anniversary (1910) of the beginning of the War of Independence (1810). And in that sense, the two blend together, as they do in the mural.

The consistent theme of all five civil wars is liberals versus conservatives and to some extent, one war led to another. One author has suggested that the 19th century in Mexico was one long civil war.

1. The War of Independence (1810–21) 
As we saw above, the right side of the center panel is devoted to the War of Independence.

Women in the War of Independence 
Women play a support role in all wars and of course, that was the case in the War of Independence. At least one source has identified the woman in blue in the image above as Leona Vicario. She was affluent and a prominent figure in the War of Independence when she financially supported the insurgents. While in Oaxaca, she contributed to the Correo Americano del Sur. And she is pictured beside the press that appears to be printing that publication. Another source identifies the woman in blue as Francisca Reyes Flores. The story of her bringing a printing press to Oaxaca in the 18th century (1720) is an interesting one. But it does not appear to warrant a place in a panel about independence, reform, and revolution in the 19th century. And neither interpretation explains why the woman in blue appears frustrated. As we know from his portrayal of other historical characters, Arturo García Bustos seems to enjoy adding a hidden meaning to the mural from time to time. Could the frustrated-looking woman in blue be another layered interpretation from the artist?

A Militia Fighting for the Conservative Cause 
For the most part, the mural is about the liberal traditions of Mexico and Oaxaca, however, the image below illustrates a Oaxacan militia on the Royalist side of the War of Independence. It was organized by Bishop Antonio Bergosa y Jordán, of Antequera, a leader in the Inquisition in Mexico. It was derisively called De la Mermelada. Apparently, at the time of the War of Independence, Mexicans made marmalade, matching the purple uniforms worn by the militia soldiers in the picture below.

The War of Independence in Oaxaca 
When the War of Independence opened 18,000 people lived in Oaxaca. They were mostly mestizos (of both Indigenous and European descent). Initially, the local government was staunchly loyal to the Spanish Crown.  But there was some support for Independence and it grew.

The image below is from the top right corner of the panel. Two elements to note are José María Morelos y Pavón and below him, the Virgin of Guadeloupe flying from the standard.

The Absence of Miguel Hidalgo (1753-1811) in the Mural 
The initiator of the War of Independence, Miguel Gregorio Antonio Ignacio Hidalgo y Costilla y Gallaga Mandarte Villaseñor does not appear in the mural. Most likely because he was not from Oaxaca and he never brought the war to Oaxaca, where his ideas were strongly opposed by Bishop Antonio Bergosa y Jordán.  Hidalgo did enjoy some success initially and some 90,000 poor people followed him on his advance to the Battle of Monte de las Cruces, until they retreated.

In addition, Hidalgo was the leader for only some eight months of an 11-year war. After the death of Hidalgo and Allende, José María Morelos along with Ignacio López Rayón, led the insurgents in the War of Independence. Morelos and insurgents pictured below captured Antequera in 1812.

Hidalgo is said to have started the War of Independence with his Grito (Cry of Dolores) on September 16, 1810. We do not know exactly what he said but it seems clear that he decried bad government and did not declare independence from Spain.

The Virgin of Guadalupe at War 
The legend is that as Hidalgo left his church to give his Grito he grabbed an image of the Virgin of Guadalupe and brandished it during his famous speech.

In the image above, the standard of the Virgin of Guadeloupe leads attacking insurgents in the pursuit of independence. José-Marie Morelos, credited the Virgin for his military victories. One of the insurgents, José Miguel Ramón Adaucto Fernández y Félix took the name of Guadalupe Victoria after a military victory at Oaxaca. (He was also Mexico's first President.) In the Mexican Revolution (1910–21), both sides flew the Virgin as they battled. In 1999, the Catholic Church officially proclaimed her the Patroness of the Americas, the Empress of Latin America, and the Protectress of Unborn Children. Whether or not the story of the Virgin of Guadalupe is a myth or a true story, she remains an important symbol of motherhood for Mexicans.

The Prehispanic Origin of the Virgin of Guadalupe 

Some Mexicans still refer to the Virgin of Guadalupe as Tonantzin. Tonantzin was a prehispanic goddess worshiped where the Virgin of Guadalupe is said to have appeared and is now worshiped at Tepeyac. In that sense the prehispanic traditions and the Christian traditions have merged.

The role of priests in the War of Independence 
One respected historian claims that 400 priests supported the War of Independence. The reason for priests leading the war is first of all because they were the leaders of the society at the time and secondly they personally, including Miguel Hidalgo, had suffered financially when the French (Bourbon) administration in Spain had imposed ruinous financial policies to pay for the war with England. Generally the War of Independence was supported by parish priests who were born in Mexico either Criollo people, generally with two Spanish parents like Hidalgo, or priest with mixed racial lineage,  Mestizos like Morelos supported the war.  On the other hand, the high level priest, born in Spain (Peninsulares or Gachupines) like Bishop of Antequera, Antonio Bergosa y Jordán opposed independence.

José María Morelos Pérez y Pavón (1765-1815) and Democratic Ideas 

Morelos wears a red bandana in two images in the mural. Some suggest that the bandana mitigated his migraines. While in Oaxaca, Morelos developed his thoughts about independence, justice and the future of Mexico. In the image below, he holds a copy of the Constitution of Apatzingán. (The official title as indicated in the mural is Decreto Constitucional para la Libertad de la América Mexicana.)

The commemorative plaque, posted in the Zócalo of Oaxaca just south of the Palacio de Gobierno, proclaims that, Morelos sowed the seeds of Mexican democracy in Oaxaca during the War of Independence.

Vicente Ramón Guerrero Saldaña (1782-1831) 
The image below of Vicente Guerrero replicates one of the most famous paintings of him. However other images exist of Guerrero that are far less flattering. And one should not assume that the images by Arturo García Bustos, like other images of historical characters painted by Bustos, are true representation.  However, the images used in the mural closely reflect popular depictions of this history maker and others.

Guerrero's father was Afro-Mexican and his mother indigenous, making Vicente Guerrero, Mexico's only afro-mestizo president. During the War of Independence, Guerrero became a military leader, and he was one of the few to escape execution during the war. After the war, in 1831, he was executed at Cuilápam de Guerrero, just 10 kilometers from Oaxaca where he had been tried. This happened, after he had been president of Mexico for only eight months.

Afro-Mexicans played an important role in the War of Independence. Below President Vicente Guerrero points out a proclamation abolishing slavery on September 16, 1829, one of his crowning achievements. Slavery formally ended in 1837 in Mexico.

Note that in the image above that the tower behind Guerrero bears a strong resemblance to those of the Ex-monastery of Santiago in Cuilapan de Guerrero.

Insurgents depicted on the mural 
In the bottom left corner of the middle panel, García Bustos placed, among other elements, insurgents associated with the War of Independence in Oaxaca. Many of the depictions of insurgents resemble images available on the internet so most insurgents can be identified. But not all are easy to identify. In cases of doubt, it is assumed that the images are of local heroes because the artist's stated goal is to depict people who frequented the Palacio de Gobierno. One publication claims that the images are "Matamoros, Allende, and Galena." But Allende and Galena, while they are important insurgents, they are not associated with the history of Oaxaca.

Those insurgents who battled locally are remembered in Oaxaca and other Mexican towns where streets bear their names and commemorate their roles in Mexico gaining independence. (It is said that at least 14,000 streets in Mexico are named after Miguel Hidalgo.) There is one image on the mural of the Royalists who defended the city against the insurgents and held the city longer than the 15 months during which the insurgents held it. We will look at it below.

José María Armenta (1775-1810) and Miguel López de Lima (?- 1810) 
Two insurgents, apparently the two at the back wearing hats typical of mule drivers, are celebrated in Oaxaca in the street Armenta y López, located near the Palacio de Gobierno. José María Armenta was a mulero, (a mule skinner or mule driver) when Miguel Hidalgo gave him the rank of colonel and sent him to Antequera to foment rebellion. López took Miguel Armenta de Lima as his lieutenant. Their story illustrates some of the complexities and tragedy of one of the five civil wars fought in Oaxaca.

When they arrived in Oaxaca, locals were suspicious of the two men, but the two were able to convince Antequera authorities that they were selling firewood. One story is that they had learned that the mayor was a Creole and they assumed that he, like many other Creoles, including themselves, was a supporter of the rebellion. When the insurgents told the mayor their intentions to start a revolution in Oaxaca, he threw them in jail.

After a trial, they were hung in the quarries of Jalatlaco. Their bodies were dismembered and strewn on the road to Etla as a warning to other potential insurgents that the colonial authorities who were in control of Antequera in 1811, meant business. After José Morelos captured Oaxaca in 1812, he ordered that the remains of insurgents who had been martyred,  Miguel López de Lima, José María Armenta, Felipe Tinoco y José María Palacios, be exhumed. Subsequently, they were celebrated in the cathedral as heroes.

Guadalupe Victoria (1786-1843) 
García Bustos tells us that he included Guadalupe Victoria in the mural. Keeping with his realism approach, the artist pictures Guadalupe Victoria, the first President of the United States of Mexico, throwing his sword to lead his men forward, as his legend accounts, in the taking of Oaxaca in 1812. As the first President of Mexico (1824–1829), he served his entire term, which did not happen until the presidency of Benito Juárez who became president for a full term in 1858.

Vicente Guerrero (1781-1831) and the abolition of slavery 
President Vicente Ramón Guerrero Saldaña (1782-1831) stands, in the mural, beside the proclamation of the abolition of slavery in Mexico of 1829. Guerrero, with black and indigenous roots, was President of Mexico in an unstable period when Mexican conservatives and liberals were still vying for power. Guerrero was accused of treason, tried in Oaxaca City, and executed in what is now called Cuilápam de Guerrero, on February 14, 1831, some 13 kilometers from the Palacio de Gobierno in Oaxaca.

Tinoco and Palacios 
Felipe Tinoco and Catarino Palacio were martyrs in the War of Independence but do not appear on the mural. They are mentioned here to illustrate the strong opposition to independence that permeated Antequera, especially in the early stages of the War. In 1811, Tinoco and Palacio met with a group of priests in the Convent of the Conception and made preliminary plans for an insurrection. They were captured and held in a prison where the Panaderia Bamby is now located. The two young insurgents were shot by a firing squad, beheaded, dismembered and their heads were placed in metal cages on the edge of the city of Antequera. These gory details emphasize the risks that anyone took when they decided to support the War of Independence and illustrate the fear that authorities tried to sow in the minds of possible insurgents.

Valerio Trujano (1767-1812) 
In the image above of the group of insurgents, Valerio Trujano could be the soldier on the priest's right. His grey hair is a clue. In 1811, at the age of 44, Valerio Trujano, a former mule driver, joined the rebels, led guerilla action against Spanish forces and won several important victories. Besieged at Huajuapan de Leó, 170 kilometers from Antequera, Trujano held out for 111 days, resisting 15 assaults, until he received reinforcements sent by the revolutionary leader José María Morelos. With the help of the extra troops, Trujano won the battle of Huajuapan, on July 13, 1812. When the royalists retreated, they abandoned 30 cannons, over 2,000 rifles, and ammunition, and left 400 dead, and more than three hundred prisoners. And the insurgents gained control of the Antequera area.

Later, in a battle in the state of Puebla, Trujano, with only one hundred men, faced four hundred royalists. During the retreat Trujano's son Gil was taken prisoner. Valerio Trujano escaped and returned to try to save his son, but he was killed on October 7, 1812.

Afro-Mexican soldiers 
In the mural, two afro-Mexicans stand among the celebrated insurgent leaders, one in the front row, one in the back. The message seems to be that afro-Mexicans, possibly former slaves, supported the rebels.

Carlos María de Bustamante (1774-1848) 
García Bustos tells us that he included Bustamante in the mural.  Bustamante was a prolific writer and insurgent born in Antequera. In the image below he is pictured with his printing press and holding a copy of El Correo del Sur. This publication was a mouthpiece to promote independence from Spain. He later wrote volumes of history about the War of Independence, thus creating stories that were not lost and helping to immortalize insurgent leaders discussed here. Bustamante's washed-out appearance, drab colors could be García Bustos ‘way of reminding us that Carlos Bustamante spent a large block of time in jail.

The man beside Carlos María de Bustamante (General Antonio de León y Loyola?) 
In the picture above, one resource suggests General Antonio de León  stands beside Carlos María de Bustamante. He was a famous son of Oaxaca born in Huajuapan de León, Oaxaca and in 1821 he funded and led an army that liberated the city of Oaxaca from Spanish rule. He also commanded the military in Oaxaca after Mexico was granted independence and in 1847 valiantly led Mexican troops in the Battle of Molino del Rey; although, he was killed and the victorious Americans advanced on Mexico City.

The picture below, the only available on the internet does not look like the man beside Bustamante but there is another image from a reputable source that cannot be posted here for copyright reasons and it does look like General Antonio de León. It can be seen here. And placing General Antonio de León beside Carlos María de Bustamante is logical because both represented Oaxaca, along with 10 others, in the Congreso Constituyente to write a new constitution for Mexico.

Manuel Sabino Crespo (1778-1814) 
Crespo,  like insurgents Morelos and Matamoros was a priest. Crespo was a leader in the War of Independence. Crespo is most likely the priest in the image of insurgents, although another source indicates that the priest is Mariano Matamoros y Guridi. The image on the mural resembles a statue of Crespo in the town of Ejutla de Crespo suggesting that this statue of Crespo is the model for the priest in the mural. Or vice versa.  Although he was a priest in the small community of San Mateo Rio Hondo, 130 km from Antequera on the road to Huatulco, he was also a professor at the seminary school of the Holy Cross of Antequera. He joined the insurgent movement when José María Morelos and others we have mentioned, carried out the capture of Antequera in 1812. In September 1813, he participated in the Congress of Anahuac as a substitute for José María Murguía y Galardi, representing the province of Oaxaca.

During the war, a civil war, there were plenty of heated discussions and Crespo participated in them, especially in the Cathedral of Antequera. In 1813 Crespo argued that priests should continue to provide the Catholic sacraments to the insurgents. It appears that Crespo did not fight in battles as a soldier, although he was wounded in 1814 in a loyalist attack in which 200 insurgents died.

When he was captured in 1814, the Bishop of Antequera, Antonio Bergosa y Jordán, recommended that Sabino Crespo be beheaded. Despite the condemnation of his bishop, Crespo died by firing squad on October 14, 1814.

General Manuel Mier y Terán (1789-1832) 
Arturo García Bustos does not illustrate executions on the mural or other forms of death but in the image below, he shows a suicide, the result of General Manuel Mier y Terán, who helped lead the assault on Oaxaca, “falling on his sword” after his troops were defeated in another military exercise in 1832. The sword appears in the image as does the skull on the extreme left. The skull represents Mictlāntēcutli, the god of death, for the Aztecs and called Kedo by the Zapotecs.

Summing up the scene above, and putting it into a larger context, the image below reflects the arc of life starting on the left with the god of life Ehécatl, moving to the middle with three generations of women who maintain life, refreshed by a flowing stream, and ending with Mictlāntēcutli, the god of death. The mother with her child is celebrating her ancestors with cempasúchil flowers, technically called Tagetes erecta or Marigolds in English. The grandmother in the back supports the mother and child. Generally speaking to the left of the image below, the mural highlights reform and to the right we have images mostly from the War of Independence.

The Mexican - American War (1846-48) 
The Mexican-American war pitted soldiers from the United States against Mexican soldiers and in that sense it not a civil war, like the other wars depicted here. Nor does it seem to appear on the mural, directly, perhaps because the Americans did not advance on Oaxaca. However, Oaxacans like Porfirio Díaz joined the military to defend Oaxaca when the Americans were moving in the direction of Oaxaca and after the Mexican-American War a teenaged Díaz decide to pursue a military career and eventually became a major Caudillo in the history of Oaxaca and Mexico. Also, Santa Anna, who led the Mexican troops and was a dictator during the war, appears on the mural in the form of his prosthetic leg.  Retreating from losses in 1848 and wanting to regroup in Oaxaca, Juárez, the Governor of Oaxaca, refused Santa Anna entry into Oaxaca. Santa Anna considered this a hostile gesture and he never forgot it. When Santa Anna regained power after the war, Juárez decided to exile himself to New Orleans in 1853. More about Santa Anna below.

War of Reform (1857-60) 
The War of Reform was a civil war growing out of Conservative reaction to progressive laws know as La Reforma passed by Liberals, initially led by Ignacio Comonfort and later by Juan Álvarez and Benito Juárez. Initially Oaxaca supported the Conservative side. The Liberal defeated the Conservatives and implemented reform legislation that began in 1854 with the Plan de Ayutla, calling for the removal of the dictator Santa Anna, leading to the Ley Juárez legislation that abolished the Fueros granting special legal and financial privileges to the Catholic Church. In Oaxaca, however, the lines between Conservatives and Liberals were not always clearly drawn. In 1857 the congress, passed a liberal, federalist constitution limiting the power of the church and the military.

A Surprise Guest 
As we saw with the shaman in prehispanic panel that looks like the artist and an image of a woman on the colonial panel that resembles his wife Rina Lazo, the artist does not hesitate to include family members in the mural and in that sense make the mural his personal story as well as the story of Oaxaca and Mexico. The soldier below depicts Nicolas Bustos, the great-grandfather of Arturo García Bustos. The artist credits this ancestor as the source of his liberal thinking.

3. The Second French Invasion, (1861–67) 
The first French Invasion called the Pastry War (1838–39) and was a minor skirmish in which French citizen tried to recover their commercial losses due to chaos that followed the independence of Mexico. And it was a harbinger of something much bigger. In the Pastry War, the French attackers were subdued by Santa Anna.

The Second French intervention in Mexico was a major war by European powers, initially France, England and Spain and later only France, to recover debts owed by Mexico and later to install a regime in Mexico favourable to France. It was a civil war like the other wars discussed here pitting Mexican conservatives against Mexican liberals. In that sense the Second French Invasion represents a continuation of the War of Reform and the War of Independence.

In the image below, which is not from the mural, Mexican Conservatives are inviting Maximilian to become the Emperor of Mexico. The role of Mexican Conservatives in keeping monarchism alive and in inviting Maximilian to Mexico sometimes gets overlooked and the Second French Intervention in Mexico is sometimes incorrectly attributed solely to France, and not linked to Mexican conservatives who also played a major role in initiating and prolonging the war.

Mexico's Emperors 
Mexico had two emperors. Both died by firing squad. The First Emperor of Mexico was Agustín de Iturbide who reigned from less than a year starting in 1822. He was executed on 19 July 1824. Maximilian I of Mexico reigned as the Emperor of the Second Mexican Empire for a little over three years until his execution on 19 June 1867.

How Mexico got her First Emperor 
Returning our attention to the War of Independence (1810-1821), after Mexico became independent from Spain, Agustín de Iturbide became Emperor of Mexico, formally from May 9, 1822, to March 19, 1823. In a strange twist of fate, it was Mexican conservatives, led by Iturbide, who brought about independence in 1821, not the liberal insurgents who had started the War of Independence in 1810. The explanation is that when liberals took power in Spain, promises were made in the Constitution of Cadiz for liberalizing the administration of the colonies like New Spain (Mexico). These changes would appease Mexican insurgents and the royalists, their opponents in the War of Independence, would lose some of their power. Rather than have Spanish liberal ideas imposed on Mexico, the Conservative agreed with the Liberals to draw up the Plan of Iguala of 1821. It contained three guarantees for establishing peace: the primacy of Roman Catholicism, the independence of Mexico, and social equality for all Mexicans.

The First President of Mexico 
The Plan of Iguala established Mexico as a constitutional monarchy and as mentioned above, Iturbide became the first emperor. But he ruled for less than a year before Guadalupe Victoria, an insurgent in the War of Independence was installed as the first president of the United States of Mexico after the adoption of the Constitution of 1824.

Benito Pablo Juárez García (1806-1872) 
Former President, Benito Juárez, is the most prominent personality, at the top and middle of the panel. This is understandable since Oaxaca had become Oaxaca de Juárez after his death in 1872. The quotation beside his floating head translates as Respect for the rights of others is peace. The full version is "Entre los individuos, como entre las naciones, el respeto al derecho ajeno es la paz.” (In English: Between individuals as between nations, respect for the rights of others is peace.) Juárez wrote these words in a manifesto dated July 15, 1867, after Maximilian was defeated and executed at the end of the Second Mexican Empire.

Margarita Maza Juárez 
García Bustos makes a statement by blending a determined, almost dour Benito Juárez with his equally determined looking partner of over 27 years, Margarita Maza. The couple married in 1843, when Juárez was a 37-year-old civil judge and the well-educated Maza was 17 years old.  Margarita's father was Italian which placed her in a much higher class than Juárez whose both parents were indigenous.  And the marriage helped inch Juárez up the social ladder in race-conscious Oaxaca. They lived in turbulent times and both were exiled to the United States at different times.  Margarita lived in New York City, and then in Washington, DC, and two of their young sons died there, in 1864 and 1865. In Washington, President Lincoln received her as the First Lady of Mexico. After Maximilian I was deposed in 1867 by Juárez forces, Margarita Maza returned to Mexico and she  lived for four more years, until she died of cancer.

Juárez and 11 men 

Benito Juárez shares a prominent place on this panel along with 11 men mostly from Oaxaca who contributed to his success. received her as They are noted for their association with the Institute of Sciences and Arts of Oaxaca, their government service, their military leadership and their service in the Juárez cabinets.

Of the seven men on the right hand of Benito Juárez, the first one is General Ignacio Zaragoza Seguin. He famously led the Mexican army of 600 men, (or was it 2,000) at the Battle of Puebla on May 5, 1862. This is the origin of the Cinco de Mayo celebrations. Next, the soldier with the hat and sword is General Mariano Escobedo. Maximilian handed him the sword he holds before his execution.

Ignacio Ramírez is third to the right of Juárez. He is famous for his atheism and contributions to anti-clericalism in Mexico that limited the Catholic Church and was linked to four of the five civil wars. Next is Matias Romero, a writer of deep thought, like others in the picture he helped to draft the Constitution of 1857. Ignacio Mariscal stands fifth. For more than 27 years he held the position of Secretary of Foreign Relations. Beside him, Marcos Pérez, a teacher at the Oaxaca State Institute of Arts and Sciences. The seventh man is José María Castillo Velasco. He also help to draft the Constitution of '57 and served as a colonel during the French Intervention. Most of these men are Caudillos (military and political leaders), a phenomenon discussed below.

Of the four men pictured on the left of Juárez, the first man is Melchor Ocampo, with his hand on his heart. In France he learned about the liberal and anticlerical ideas of the Enlightenment and the French Revolution. His radical anti-clerical ideas were incorporated in the Reform Laws and the Mexican Constitution of 1857. Next is Ignacio Mejía. He was a Mexican politician and also he fought in the Mexican-American War (1846–48), in the War of Reform (1858–60), in the Second French Intervention in Mexico (1861-1867). Next, a young Porfirio Díaz Mori looks defiant in his military uniform. He supported Juárez in the Reform War and during the French invasion. Later he broke with Juárez and became the dictator-president of Mexico for 34 years. Both Juárez and Díaz were from Oaxaca and attended El Instituto de Ciencias y Artes de Oaxaca where they learned liberal ideas. Díaz later supplement his liberal ideas with strong-arm techniques. The last man to the left of Juárez is José Marie Díaz Ordaz. He was a governor of Oaxaca and fought against the Conservatives.

One image that sums up the challenges and achievements of Benito Juárez 
The image below is located in the center of the entire mural. It represents essential challenges and achievements of Juárez and other Mexican and Oaxacan Liberals before and after Juárez, who saw himself as the embodiment of the lay state.    Three of the four documents on the left side of the image above represent the legislative achievements of Liberalism. The Constitution of 1824 is the first republican constitution of the United States of Mexico. El Codigo Civil Oaxacaqueño (1826-1829) was the first civil code in Mexico.  The third document, the Constitution of 1857 combined with the Ley Juárez,  significantly reduced the power of the Catholic Church and led to the Reform War. The forth document, the Constitution of 1917, the current constitution of Mexico, written during the Mexican Revolution, sits on top of the other documents indicating that they build on each other but the Constitution of 1917  supersedes the others.  For the first time the constitution included commitments such as free, mandatory, and secular education.

At the top of the image, the hand of Juárez on a book suggests completion of his work and swearing an oath.  The light green pillar reflects the Cantera stone used to build Antequera, earning it the name of Antequera Verde. Liberdad, Igualidad, Fraternidad the Spanish for the rallying cry of the French Revolution places Juárez with the famous progressive thinkers of his era. The sword is the one that Maximilian handed to General Escobedo before his execution. The crown of the Hapsburgs represents Maximilian who was the Second Emperor of Mexico from 1864 until he was executed in1867.

The artificial leg at the bottom of the image above belonged to Antonio de Padua María Severino López de Santa Anna y Pérez de Lebrón (commonly known as Santa Anna) who was a constant thorn in Juárez side. He exiled Juárez to New Orleans, USA in 1853. When Santa Anna lost his leg in battle he used the story to enhance public sympathy, even digging up the amputated part of his leg and holding an elaborate state funeral.

Santa Anna, the Caudillo of Veracruz (1794-1876) 
Mexico struggled after the war of independence and had 50 governments in 30 years. In part Santa Anna led this chaos as president 11 times between the years of 1833 and 1855, serving for various lengths of time. Santa Anna with a power base and an army in Veracruz and used it to wage war and take the reins of power as required, or as he wished. Once again, Santa Anna does not appear in the mural, but García Bustos, always ready to add something  mural, included Santa Anna's famous prosthetic leg.

Government by buggy 
In the image below, behind Juárez and his supporters, we see a buggy that Juárez drove through the countryside after he was exiled from Mexico City while the Conservatives usurped power during the Second French Intervention. The carriage, a Landau, was known as the “government on wheels".

Porfirio Díaz, the soldier 
In the image above, Porfirio Díaz is the soldier on the extreme right. This depiction resembles a photo from 1867 when he was rising to the rank of general.  Porfirio Díaz played a central role in battles in the Reform War and the Second French Intervention. In the Reform War, in the Battle of Oaxaca of 1858, the Conservatives attacked and held Díaz and his soldiers and other leaders in the convents of Santo Domingo, Carmen Alto and Santa Catarina for 19 days before the Oaxacans broke out on January 16 and defeated the conservatives in places such as the present day Zocalo and  Llano Park.  Major battles took place, with victories for Díaz and his troops on May, 11  and again on August 5, 1860.

In the  French Intervention the soldiers commanded by Díaz defeated the Imperial army of Maximillian at the Battle of Miahuatlán  on October 3, 1866, and the Battle of La Carbonara on October 18, leading to the liberation of Oaxaca City from Imperial troops on October 31. Both battles were decisive, and allowed Díaz troops to completely rearm and prepare for the Third Battle of Puebla of April 2, 1867. These victories, under Díaz also prepared the republican forces to attack Querétaro, take Maximillian prisoner, execute him, and to enter Mexico City without resistance, and restore the Republic, with Juárez as president on July 15, 1867.

Porfirio Díaz, the politician 
Following his military success, Díaz sought political power. After 1867, with Juárez back as president, Díaz went on the attack because the constitution permitted only one term as president. In 1870 Díaz ran against Juárez and lost. He challenged that the election was rigged and eventually encouraged rebellions against Juárez, which failed. Through a series of rebellions, after Juárez died and his successor Ledo had served, Díaz became president in 1877.

Industrial expansion 
At the top the image below we see images relating to industrial expansion that occurred in Mexico during the dictatorship of Porfirio Díaz. Electricity towers, oil refinery, shipping. Below it is a space devoted to the reaction to the industrialization and the poverty of the masses. And on the left we see images of post-revolutionary leaders.

Accomplishments of the Díaz presidency

While the Juárez presidency is noted for establishing liberal legislation, the Díaz regime is know for economic progress. Some of the achievements are 800 kilometers of railways, 20,000 kilometers of telegraph lines, and 1,200 post offices. In addition, Díaz brought the telephone and electricity to Oaxaca and elsewhere in Mexico.

The Mexican Revolution, (1910-21) 
In the image below, from the left side of the middle panel of the mural at the top, we see evidence of industrialization, on the right is the reaction of leaders like Ricardo Flores Magón. The middle is occupied by the politician Francisco I. Madero and José Maria Pino Suárez. Further left are leading thinkers from Oaxaca, of the post revolutionary period, José Vasconcelos, Andrés Henestrosa and Nazario Chacón.

Ricardo Flores Magón (1874–1922) 
Two images of Ricardo Flores Magón appear on the mural. He appears in the image above on the right side. The Zapata rallying cry Tierra y Liberdade appears on his left, underlining Flores Magón's siding with the rural movement led by Emiliano Zapata. Flores Magón also appears as a large floating head on the panel, as discussed below.

Ricardo Flores Magón was born in the independent indigenous community, San Antonio Eloxochitlán, Oaxaca, now known as Eloxochitlán de Flores Magón. It is 233 kilometers from Oaxaca City almost halfway between Oaxaca City and Mexico City. Richard Flores Magón, was a thought leader of the Mexican Revolution, an anarchist and the creator of Regeneración along with his brothers Enrique and Jesús. And to his right, devils appear to taunt Flores Magón and below him, peace doves he holds the text that we see more clearly.
The text says in Spanish:

Palabras a los Mexicanos

"El Reloj de la Historia está proximo a senalar, con su aguja inexorable, el instante en que de produicir  la muerte de una sociedad agonize. El imperio del capital se derrumba por todos partes. Ha sonado la hora de la justicia para los desheredados. Si no has oído su vibración intensa, ¡Tanto peor para ti!”

Or in English:

Words to Mexicans

"The Clock of History is about to mark, with its inexorable needle, the moment in which it will bring about the death of a dying society. The empire of capital is collapsing everywhere. The hour of justice has struck. for the disinherited. If you have not heard its intense vibration, so much the worse for you! "

The Importance of Ricardo Flores Magón for Arturo García Bustos and others 
Arturo García Bustos placed a head of Ricardo Flores Magón at the same level as Benito Juárez, Margaret Maza and José Maria Morelos, indicating that for him, Ricardo Flores Magón was a major player in the history of Oaxaca and Mexico.  

García Bustos was an active member of  communist and socialist groups, especially those associated with artists such as the Taller de Gráfica Popular.  His travels led him to East Germany, Cuba and Guatemala where he learned about international socialist movements including the Russian sponsored World Peace Council. So understandably a Mexican communist thought leader, born in Oaxaca, was an important subject for García Bustos. Flores also appears prominently in the famous murals of Diego Rivera, David Alfaro Siqueiros and others. Over the years, various images of Flores Magón have been used to reflect the state version of moderate socialism, not the anarchist views of Flores Magón expressed above in Palabras a los Mexicanos.

Francisco Ignacio Madero González (1873-1913) and José María Pino Suárez (1869-1913) 
Madero and Suárez are located on the left side of the Independence, Reform, Revolution Panel. They were not born in Oaxaca and they have little direct association with the history of Oaxaca. However, Madero is an important figure in Mexican history because he challenged Porfirio Díaz in the 1910 election. Díaz declared himself victorious for an eighth term in what amounted to another rigged election. In 1911 Madero was elected in a landslide and sworn into office on 6 November 1911. Generals Félix Díaz (a Oaxacan nephew of Porfirio Díaz of Oaxaca), led a coup supported by United States ambassador Henry Lane Wilson. Madero was captured and assassinated along with vice-president Pino Suárez in a series of events now called the Ten Tragic Days, The ensuing chaos impacted Oaxaca as we will see below.

The Mexican Revolution in Oaxaca 
Francisco Ignacio Madero visited Oaxaca in December, 1909 to rally support for his bid at the presidency.  In 1911, as President of Mexico, Madero gained support in Oaxaca from Governor Benito Juárez Maza, the son of Benito Juárez Garcia.

In Oaxaca, during the Mexican Revolution, especially initially, the battles and the chaos was in the political system. Between December 1910 and June 1915, the government of Oaxaca changed 33 times, with 16 different governors. There were many factions, including Maderistas, one of 14 factions. supporting Francisco Ignacio Madero González.  Recent studies reveal that the Maderista movements in Oaxaca was not rural but middle class, seeking social mobility, and greater local autonomy. Evidence of at least one rural uprising in Oaxaca was in line with rebellions in other parts of Mexico. Maderistas from Guerrero, led Mixtec peasants of Pinotepa Nacional, Oaxaca, to revolt on 18 May 1911. They demanded the return of their ancient communal lands. The revolt was not successful and the leaders were executed. In 1915 after President Carranza suspended the constitution, the State of Oaxaca declared itself a free and sovereign state.

Oaxacan Leaders, post-revolutionary period 

On the left side of the panel, beside the images of Madero and Suárez, the artist placed three Mexican leaders from Oaxacan, Nazario Chacon Pineda  Andrés Henestrosa Morales, and José Vasconcelos Calderón. In the image below, Nazario Chacon is the less visible.  Andres Henestrosa is in the middle and José Vasconcelos Calderón is in front. Each left his mark on Mexico in a different way.

Nazario Chacon Pineda (1916-1994) 
Nazario Chacon was a poet from Juchitán de Zaragoza, a city in the  Istmo de Tehuantepec region of Oaxaca. Chacon Pineda wrote lyrical poetry in his rfegional version of Zapotec, which is a richly poetic language.  Zapotec is the oldest written language in the Americas and there are 57 variations according to some linguists, and although the version spoken by Nazario Chacon is only spoken by some 100,000 people, it is considered a Mexican national treasure. Here is an example of his poetry in Spanish and English which, while it does not reflect the music of the Zapotec language, it does nevertheless illustrate the authors deep connection with nature.

Flor de los olivos

Si al acercar los oídos al caracol primitivo,

el viento propagara repetida, la queja

niña del amor de los orígenes, nacida

en la impalpable espina del martirio,

la ola agitaría el mar del sentimiento,

la minúscula barca del sentido;

presto al pulso y al latido inusitado,

semejante al anhelo y al delirio.

olive flower

If by bringing your ears closer to the primitive conch shell,

the wind will propagate repeated, the complaint

origins love girl, born

on the impalpable thorn of martyrdom,

the wave would shake the sea of feeling,

the tiny boat of meaning;

quick to the pulse and the unusual heartbeat,

akin to longing and delirium.

. . .

Andrés Henestrosa Morales (1906-2008) 

Andrés Henestrosa Morales was born in Ixhuatán, Oaxaca. He was a leader in the realm of Mexican Literature and politician. In addition to his prose and poetry, Henestrosa was elected to the federal legislature, serving three terms in the Chamber of Deputies, as a senator representing the state of Oaxaca from 1982 to 1988.

José Vasconcelos Calderón (1882–1959) 
We referred to José Vasconcelos at the beginning of this Wikipedia article under the background section because he was the government official who is credited with initiating the project to create public art like the murals of Diego Rivera.

In the image above, the text above the heads of the three men was authored by Vasconcelos. The text is a shortened version of the following:

“El cargo que ocupo me pone en el deber de hacerme intérprete de las aspiraciones populares, y en nombre de ese pueblo que me envía os pido a vosotros, y junto con vosotros a todos los intelectuales de México, que salgáis de vuestras torres de marfil para sellar pacto de alianza con la Revolución. Alianza para la obra de redimirnos mediante el trabajo, la virtud y el saber. El país ha menester de vosotros. La Revolución ya no quiere, como en sus días de extravío, cerrar las escuelas y perseguir a los sabios”

The above, translated, by machine, into English is:

“The position I occupy puts me in the duty of becoming an interpreter of popular aspirations, and on behalf of that people that sends me, I ask you, and together with you all the intellectuals of Mexico, to come out of your ivory towers. to seal an alliance pact with the Revolution. Alliance for the work of redeeming ourselves through work, virtue and knowledge. The country needs you. The Revolution no longer wants, as in its days of misguidance, to close the schools and persecute the wise.”

José Vasconcelos was born in Oaxaca, Oaxaca. In his youth his family moved to Piedras Negras, Coahuila, a border town where he attended school in Eagle Pass, Texas. As a result, he became fluently bilingual in Spanish and English and moved freely, working and writing in the English-speaking world.  He developed a theory that Mexicans could become a fifth "cosmic race", a new superior civilization built on the genes of existing civilizations flowing through the veins of Mexicans. In 1924 he ran for governor of Oaxaca and lost in a disputed election.  He ran in the 1929 Mexican presidential election, was defeated, claimed the results were rigged and developed his call to insurrection in his "Plan de Guaymas". The eminent historian Enrique Krauze, who is cited in several places in this article, claims that Vasconcelos would have won if the election had not been rigged in favour of Pascual Ortiz Rubio.

The Cristero War in Oaxaca (1926–29) 
There do not seem to be any clear references on the mural to the Cristero Wars in Oaxaca. There was little confrontation between the government and the Church in Oaxaca during the Cristero Wars because of a gentleman's agreement between the local government and the Church designed to avoid bloodshed. However, there was some conflict. On October 10, 1928, the Catholic rebels liberators ambushed a party of soldiers, killing 21. On December 18 they kill another 12 soldiers.

Of the five civil wars reviewed here: War of Independence (1810–21), War of Reform (1857-60), the Second French Invasion, (1861–67) the Mexican Revolution, (1910-21), it was the Cristero War (1926–29) that had less impact on Oaxaca.

A jubilant parade 
The artist depicts musical instruments on all three panels, as music is an important aspect of the culture of Oaxaca. The bottom left corner of the middle panel illustrates a parade with brass instruments, colorful Huipil blouses of the Isthmus of Tehuantepec, and a flute player.  He wears purple, the color representing the conservative militia of the War of Independence (1810-1821).

Conclusion 
Oaxaca has a rich and varied history. Constant conflict between liberal and conservative values has frequently surfaced, contributing to five civil wars and sometimes chaotic politics. National leaders such as José Vasconcelos, Porfirio Díaz and Benito Juarez, all with Oaxacan roots provided leadership in times of turmoil. In the mural Garcia Bustos portrays the conflicts that have risen in Oaxaca, from a liberal perspective, for example focusing on the deeds of Benito Juárez rather than Porfirio Díaz.  Although both men were Liberals with a capital "L".  Juárez was more a small "l" liberal than Díaz.

Notes

References 

Are these cites for the same source?

Further reading

External links
History of Oaxaca Part 2 – Colonial Era

1970s murals
Murals in Mexico